USS Westport has been the name of more than one United States Navy ship, and may refer to:

 , a hospital and ambulance boat commissioned in 1918, renamed USS Adrian five days after her acquisition
 , a cargo ship in commission from 1918 to 1919

Westport